I Was Made to Love Her may refer to:

 "I Was Made to Love Her" (song), a 1967 song by Stevie Wonder
 I Was Made to Love Her (album), a 1967 album by Stevie Wonder